Hix or HIX may refer to:

People 
 DJ Hix, Northern Irish DJ
 Hix McCanless, American architect
 H. L. Hix (born 1960), American poet
 Mark Hix, English chef
 Simon Hix (born 1968), British political scientist

Places 
In the United States
 Hix, Georgia, an unincorporated community
 Hix, McDowell County, West Virginia, an unincorporated community
 Hix, Summers County, West Virginia, an unincorporated community

Elsewhere
 Hix, a village in Bourg-Madame, France

Other uses 
 Health insurance exchange, in the United States
 Hixkaryana language, spoken in Brazil
 Jake Hix, a character in All the Wrong Questions

See also
Hicks (disambiguation)